Steve Hywood (born 31 May 1950) is a former Australian rules footballer who played for Richmond in the Victorian Football League (VFL).

Hywood joined Richmond from South Broken Hill and was a half back flanker in the 1972 VFL Grand Final, the only loss he played in all year. Clearance problems meant that he couldn't continue at Richmond so he transferred to Glenelg and was a member of their drought breaking 1973 premiership team. He played a season in Tasmania, at Sandy Bay, during which time he represented the state at the 1975 Knockout Carnival, before returning to Glenelg, where he played until retiring after the 1979 SANFL season.

After retiring from playing Hywood coached the Glenelg reserves team to consecutive premierships (1981 and 1982), and now runs his own car dealership business in the Adelaide suburb of Darlington.

References
Bibliography

Holmesby, Russell and Main, Jim (2007). The Encyclopedia of AFL Footballers. 7th ed. Melbourne: Bas Publishing.
Citations

1950 births
Living people
Richmond Football Club players
Glenelg Football Club players
Sandy Bay Football Club players
South Broken Hill Football Club players
Australian rules footballers from New South Wales